The Unsellables is a British reality game show that debuted on 11 May 2009. The television series ended on 5 June 2009. The show aired on BBC One, the television show was also distributed by the BBC. The Unsellables focuses on helping people who have troubles selling their houses. The Unsellables is a Housing/Building lifestyle type game show. The television series was based on the original Canadian version of the series.

Production
The Unsellables is presented by Sofie Allsopp & John Rennie. Rob Carey & Leonie Hutchinson are the executive producers of the series. The series is filmed in the United Kingdom. The Unsellables runs for 30 minutes. The Unsellables is a UK-Canada co-production and is produced by NF-Cineflix (Unsellables UK) Inc. and Media Productions (Unsellables UK) Limited.

Cast
The main cast on The Unsellables (UK) are John Rennie & Sofie Allsopp which are the presenters of the show, they play themselves.  Sofie Allsopp is also a presenter on the Canadian version of the series.

Media information

Episodes
This is a List of The Unsellables (UK) episodes.

International broadcasts

DVD/Blu-ray releases
The Unsellables was not released on DVD.

Online media
The Unsellables was available on the BBC iPlayer until the show got cancelled. The Unsellables was also available on the online HGTV player in Canada and the US until the show got cancelled. Full episodes were also available on the iTunes Store until the series was cancelled. The series was also available on Amazon Video until 2010. People cannot currently watch this series online.

See also
The Unsellables (Original Canadian series)
BBC One
List of programmes broadcast by the BBC
HGTV (Canada)

References

External links

BBC Television shows
2009 British television series debuts
2009 British television series endings